Queen Creek is a town in Maricopa and Pinal counties in the state of Arizona. The population was 59,519 as of the 2020 census, up from 26,361 at the 2010 census. It is a suburb of Phoenix, Arizona located in the far southeast area of the Phoenix metropolitan area.

History
From the post office form on file at the National Archives, Queen Creek was originally known as "Rittenhouse", the community growing up out of a railroad stop. In 1919 the Queen Creek Farms Company was formed by C. H. Rittenhouse, constructing that railroad stop to ship the goods from the farm. Its eponymous creek (now a usually dry arroyo), Queen Creek, flowed through Queen Canyon and was named for the Silver Queen Mine, but it was originally called "Picket Post Creek".

Geography
The town of Queen Creek is primarily within Maricopa County, but the town limits extend into Pinal County on the eastern and southern borders. The town is bordered to the south and east in Pinal County by the unincorporated community of San Tan Valley (population 96,692).

Demographics

As of the census of 2010, there were 26,361 people, 8,557 households, residing in the town. The racial makeup of the town was 82.1% White, 0.4% Black or African American, 6.5% Native American, 0.3% Asian, 0.1% Pacific Islander, 14.3% from other races, and 2.3% from two or more races.  17.3% of the population were Hispanic or Latino of any race.

There were 1,218 households, out of which 50.7% had children under the age of 18 living with them, 75.9% were married couples living together, 7.2% had a female householder with no husband present, and 11.8% were non-families. 8.0% of all households were made up of individuals, and 2.8% had someone living alone who was 65 years of age or older.  The average household size was 3.54 and the average family size was 3.77.

In the town, the population age spread was: 35.4% under the age of 18, 8.7% from 18 to 24, 30.1% from 25 to 44, 20.9% from 45 to 64, and 4.8% who were 65 years of age or older.  The median age was 31 years. For every 100 females, there were 104.8 males.  For every 100 females age 18 and over, there were 105.3 males.

The median income for a household in the town was $63,702, and the median income for a family was $65,679. Males had a median income of $45,000 versus $31,447 for females. The per capita income for the town was $21,592.  About 6.0% of families and 9.2% of the population were below the poverty line, including 10.0% of those under age 18 and 6.5% of those age 65 or over.

Education
The town of Queen Creek is served by six public school districts, as well as public charter schools and a private school. Queen Creek Unified School District serves the greatest number of Queen Creek students.
 Queen Creek High School
 Newell Barney Junior High

The other public district schools serving Queen Creek are the Higley Unified School District, Chandler Unified School District, Florence Unified School District, J. O. Combs Unified School District, and the Apache Junction Unified School District.

Public charter schools serving QC students include:
 American Leadership Academy, a local public charter district with a K–6 school and the grades 7–12. American Leadership Academy High School located on the same campus at the southwest corner of Hawes Road and Chandler Heights Blvd. 
Benjamin Franklin Charter School
Cambridge Academy
Heritage Academy

Higher education offerings include Communiversity at Queen Creek (Rio Salado College).

 Rittenhouse Elementary School/San Tan Historical Society Museum

Notable people
 Brock Purdy, American football player

Historic properties

There are various properties in the town of Queen Creek which are considered historical and have been included either in the National Register of Historic Places or listed as such by the San Tan Historical Society. The following are images of some of these properties with a short description of the same.

See also

 List of historic properties in Queen Creek, Arizona
 Mansel Carter
 Pegasus Airpark

References

External links

 

Towns in Maricopa County, Arizona
Towns in Pinal County, Arizona
Populated places established in 1990
Populated places in the Sonoran Desert
Phoenix metropolitan area
1990 establishments in Arizona